The Mono people are a Sub-Saharan people of the Sudanic cluster residing on land adjacent to the northwestern border of the Democratic Republic of Congo.

External links
People in Country Profile for the Mono People Joshua Project

Ethnic groups in the Democratic Republic of the Congo